Heterodoxa hivaoae is a species of ulidiid or picture-winged fly in the genus Heterodoxa of the family Ulidiidae.

References

Ulidiidae